The 1959–60 Scottish Second Division was won by St Johnstone who, along with second placed Dundee United, were promoted to the First Division. Cowdenbeath finished bottom.

Table

References 

 Scottish Football Archive

Scottish Division Two seasons
2
Scot